The Milwaukee Brewers are a Major League Baseball (MLB) franchise based in Milwaukee, Wisconsin. They play in the National League Central division. Established in Seattle, Washington, as the Seattle Pilots in 1969, the team became the Milwaukee Brewers after relocating to Milwaukee in 1970. The franchise played in the American League until 1998, when it moved to the National League in conjunction with a major league realignment. Since the institution of MLB's Rule 4 draft, the Brewers have selected 67 players in the first round. Officially known as the "First-Year Player Draft", the Rule 4 draft is MLB's primary mechanism for assigning players from high schools, colleges, and other amateur clubs to its franchises. The draft order is determined based on the previous season's standings, with the team possessing the worst record receiving the first pick. In addition, teams which lost free agents in the previous off-season may be awarded compensatory or supplementary picks.

Of the 67 players picked in the first round by Milwaukee, 27 have been pitchers, the most of any position; 17 of these were right-handed, while 10 were left-handed. Fourteen outfielders, 13 shortstops, 4 third basemen, 3 first basemen, 3 catchers, and 3 second basemen were also taken. Fifteen of the players came from high schools or universities in the state of California, and Florida follows with ten players.

Two Brewers first-round picks have been elected to the Baseball Hall of Fame: Robin Yount (1973) was inducted in 1999 and Paul Molitor (1977) in 2004. The Brewers have retired Yount's jersey number 19 and Molitor's jersey number 4. Yount was named the American League Most Valuable Player in 1982 and 1989. Ryan Braun (2005) won the National League Rookie of the Year Award in 2007.

The Brewers have made 16 supplemental selections and have made one first overall selection in the draft. Three of these have been compensatory picks. These additional selections are provided when a team loses a particularly valuable free agent in the prior off-season, or, more recently, if a team fails to sign a draft pick from the previous year. They have made four Competitive Balance picks. Since 2013, these selections have been granted to the 10 lowest-revenue clubs and the clubs from the 10 smallest markets and are made between the first and second rounds. The Brewers have failed to sign four of their first-round picks: Bill Bordley (1976), Alex Fernandez (1988), Kenny Henderson (1991), and Dylan Covey (2010).

Key

Picks

See also
Milwaukee Brewers minor league players

Footnotes

References
Specific

General

First-round
Milwaukee Brewers